The Ministry of Environment is the Uruguayan government ministry which oversees the environment of Uruguay.

It was created on July 9, 2020, and the current Minister of Environment is Robert Bouvier, who has held the position since January 30, 2023.

The ministry oversees  the Uruguayan governmental enforcement of the Escazú Agreement which protects environmental defenders and guarantees freedom of information around human rights violations n environmental contexts.

List of Ministers

See also
Cabinet of Uruguay
List of Ministers of Housing, Territorial Planning and Environment of Uruguay

References

External links
  Official website

Environment
Environment of Uruguay
Uruguay, Environment
Uruguay, Environment
2020 establishments in Uruguay
Luis Alberto Lacalle Pou